Theis Palm is a Danish sailor in the Soling, Dragon, H-boat and Folkboat classes. He won the 2009 Dragon World Championships together with Poul Richard Høj Jensen and Lars Jensen.

References

Danish male sailors (sport)
Dragon class sailors
H-boat class sailors
Nordic Folkboat class sailors
Haderslev Sejl-Club sailors
Living people
Year of birth missing (living people)
Soling class world champions